Giovanni Tommaso Perrone (1601 – 16 November 1677) was a Roman Catholic prelate who served as Bishop of Nicastro (1639–1677).

Biography
Giovanni Tommaso Perrone was born in Rossano, Italy in 1601.
On 11 April 1639, he was appointed during the papacy of Pope Urban VIII as Bishop of Nicastro.
On 25 April 1639, he was consecrated bishop by Alessandro Cesarini (iuniore), Cardinal-Deacon of Sant'Eustachio, with Tommaso Carafa, Bishop Emeritus of Vulturara e Montecorvino, and Lorenzo della Robbia, Bishop of Fiesole, serving as co-consecrators. 
He served as Bishop of Nicastro until his death on 16 November 1677.

References

External links and additional sources
 (for Chronology of Bishops) 
 (for Chronology of Bishops)  

17th-century Italian Roman Catholic bishops
Bishops appointed by Pope Urban VIII
1601 births
1677 deaths
People from Rossano